The Pirate is a 1978 American two-part, four-hour television miniseries directed by Ken Annakin. It is based on the 1974 novel with the same title written by Harold Robbins. It was broadcast in two parts by CBS on November 21–22, 1978.

Plot
A man raised by wealthy and powerful Arab parents, is put in charge of his country's vast oil fortunes; only to discover he was born to Jewish birth parents. He then comes into conflict with a terrorist group...headed by his own daughter!

Cast 
 Franco Nero as Baydr Al Fay
 Anne Archer as Jordana Mason
 Olivia Hussey as Leila
 Ian McShane as Rashid
 Christopher Lee as Samir Al Fay
 Michael Constantine as Yashir
 James Franciscus as Dick Carriage
 Armand Assante as Ahmed
 Stuart Whitman as Terry Sullivan
 Eli Wallach as Ben Ezra
 Carol Bagdasarian	as Maryam
 Jeff Corey as Prince Feiyad
 Marjorie Lord as Mrs. Mason
 Ferdy Mayne as Jabir
 Michael Pataki as General Eshnev
 Murray Salem as Ramadan 
 Dimitra Arliss as Nabilia
 Leo Rossi	as Shadin

References

External links
 
 
 

1978 films
1978 television films
1970s American television miniseries
1978 drama films
Films about terrorism
Films directed by Ken Annakin
Films set in the Middle East
American drama television films
1970s English-language films
1970s American films